The Jean Hasbrouck House is a historic house on Historic Huguenot Street in New Paltz, New York.  Built in 1721, it is one of the best examples of colonial Dutch architecture in stone in the United States.  The house is a National Historic Landmark and is part of the larger Huguenot Street Historic District, also a National Historic Landmark.

History of the house
The house was built in 1721 by Jean Hasbrouck's son Jacob, and perhaps incorporates elements of a timber-framed home built by Jean Hasbrouck on the same site circa 1678.  The Hasbroucks were Huguenots who fled persecution in France and co-founded New Paltz. Their house is considered an excellent example of Hudson Valley Dutch architecture and is well preserved. It received its current designation in 1967.

Significant features include a wide center hallway, a substantial attic space, originally used as a garret, and the only original 18th century jambless fireplace found in the houses of Historic Huguenot Street. The north wall underwent a substantial restoration in 2006, which included the installation of reproduction Dutch-style casement windows.

The house served as both a home for family members and a store for the small village. Several enslaved individuals owned by the Hasbroucks also lived on the site, three of whom were named in Jean Hasbrouck's will as "Gerritt," "James," and "Molly." Several generations of Hasbrouck family members lived in the house, including Josiah Hasbrouck, who served in U.S. Congress during the Thomas Jefferson and James Madison administrations, and who built the substantial Locust Lawn Estate just outside New Paltz.

The house was purchased by the organization known today as Historic Huguenot Street in 1899, and has been used as a museum ever since. Guided tours are available to the public by appointment.

References

External links

Jean Hasbrouck House at Historic Hasbrouck Houses on the Hasbrouck Family Association website.

Restoration Plastering Work

Huguenot history in the United States
National Historic Landmarks in New York (state)
Houses in Ulster County, New York
National Register of Historic Places in Ulster County, New York
New Paltz, New York
Houses completed in 1721
Museums in Ulster County, New York
Historic house museums in New York (state)
Hasbrouck
Historic American Buildings Survey in New York (state)
Individually listed contributing properties to historic districts on the National Register in New York (state)
Stone houses in New York (state)
1721 establishments in the Province of New York
National Historic Landmark District contributing properties